The 2001 Brown Bears football team was an American football team that represented Brown University during the 2001 NCAA Division I-AA football season. Brown finished third in the Ivy League. 

In their fourth season under head coach Phil Estes, the Bears compiled a 6–3 record and outscored opponents 319 to 235. Uwa Airhiavbere, Dewey Ames, and T. Rowley were the team captains. 

The Bears' 5–2 conference record placed third in the Ivy League standings. They outscored Ivy opponents 241 to 170. 

Brown played its home games at Brown Stadium in Providence, Rhode Island.

Schedule

References

Brown
Brown Bears football seasons
Brown Bears football